A mechanized process is one that uses machines. Related articles:
Mechanised agriculture, agriculture using powered machinery
Mechanization, doing work with machinery
 Military:
 Self-propelled artillery, also known as mechanized artillery, artillery that has its own propulsion system
 Armoured warfare, also known as mechanized warfare, warfare fought using tanks and other armored vehicles
Mechanized infantry, infantry that is equipped with armored vehicles
Mechanize, an album by Fear Factory